The Munro Ambulance Corps  was started in August 1914 by Hector Munro, who was one of the directors of the Medico-Psychological Clinic in London. The mission of the Corps was to move wounded troops from the battlefield to hospitals in Flanders during World War I. Some of its noteworthy members were British writer May Sinclair, British heiress Lady Dorothie Feilding, and nurses Elsie Knocker and Mairi Chisholm.

References 

Ambulance services of World War I